Abbas Mohamed Djallal Aïssaoui (born October 5, 1986, in El Bayadh) is an Algerian football player who is currently playing as a midfielder for WA Tlemcen in the Algerian Ligue Professionnelle 2.

Club career
In July 2007, he was a handed a trial with Belgian club KSC Lokeren.

External links
 DZFoot Profile

1986 births
Algerian footballers
Algerian Ligue Professionnelle 1 players
Algeria under-23 international footballers
ASO Chlef players
CR Belouizdad players
Living people
MC Oran players
People from El Bayadh
USM El Harrach players
Association football midfielders
21st-century Algerian people